Castellar del Riu is a municipality in the comarca of Berguedà, Catalonia, northern Spain. The municipal government is located at Llinars, which is not a village but just a few municipal buildings including a small sports centre.

Economy
The municipality's economy is principally centered on agriculture, and in particular dryland farming and animal husbandry. There is also small-scale tourism in the municipality, to the Pi de les Tres Branques (a monumental tree which is a popular venue for Catalan nationalist gatherings), and especially the ski station of Rasos de Peguera.

References

External links
  
 Government data pages 

Municipalities in Berguedà
Populated places in Berguedà